Diane E. Tebelius (born 1948) is an American attorney and former federal prosecutor, Tebelius was the chair of the Washington State Republican Party from 2006 to 2007. In 2004, she ran in the Republican primary for election to Washington's 8th congressional district. In a field of four, she finished second behind popular King County Sheriff Dave Reichert who went on to win the general election.

Personal life and education
Tebelius was born in 1948 in North Dakota where she was raised on a wheat farm. She received a bachelor's degree in history from Walla Walla College. After teaching math in public schools, Tebelius earned a J.D. degree from Whittier College School of Law and a Master's degree in taxation from Georgetown University. In 1985, she married attorney Robert McCallum. They live in Bellevue, Washington.

Career
In 1981, Tebelius was hired as a special counsel to the United States Senate Committee on the Budget to work on President Ronald Reagan's first budget and tax proposal. In 1986, she became an assistant United States Attorney in Seattle, Washington. Tebelius retired as a prosecutor in 2006.

References

Living people
People from North Dakota
State political party chairs of Washington (state)
Washington (state) Republicans
Women in Washington (state) politics
Whittier Law School alumni
Georgetown University alumni
Walla Walla University alumni
1948 births
21st-century American women